This list indexes the individual year in LGBT rights articles.

2020s 

 2020s in LGBT rights
 2023 in LGBT rights
 2022 in LGBT rights
 2021 in LGBT rights
 2020 in LGBT rights

2010s 

 2010s in LGBT rights
 2019 in LGBT rights
 2018 in LGBT rights
 2017 in LGBT rights
 2016 in LGBT rights
 2015 in LGBT rights
 2014 in LGBT rights
 2013 in LGBT rights
 2012 in LGBT rights
 2011 in LGBT rights
 2010 in LGBT rights

2000s 
 2000s in LGBT rights
 2009 in LGBT rights
 2008 in LGBT rights
 2007 in LGBT rights
 2006 in LGBT rights
 2005 in LGBT rights
 2004 in LGBT rights
 2003 in LGBT rights
 2002 in LGBT rights
 2001 in LGBT rights
 2000 in LGBT rights

1990s 
 1990s in LGBT rights
 1999 in LGBT rights
 1998 in LGBT rights
 1997 in LGBT rights
 1996 in LGBT rights
 1995 in LGBT rights
 1994 in LGBT rights
 1993 in LGBT rights
 1992 in LGBT rights
 1991 in LGBT rights
 1990 in LGBT rights

1980s 
 1980s in LGBT rights
 1989 in LGBT rights
 1988 in LGBT rights
 1987 in LGBT rights
 1986 in LGBT rights
 1985 in LGBT rights
 1984 in LGBT rights
 1983 in LGBT rights
 1982 in LGBT rights
 1981 in LGBT rights
 1980 in LGBT rights

1970s 
 1970s in LGBT rights
 1979 in LGBT rights
 1978 in LGBT rights
 1977 in LGBT rights
 1976 in LGBT rights
 1975 in LGBT rights
 1974 in LGBT rights
 1973 in LGBT rights
 1972 in LGBT rights
 1971 in LGBT rights
 1970 in LGBT rights

Older 
 1960s in LGBT rights
 1950s in LGBT rights
 1900–1949 in LGBT rights
 19th century in LGBT rights
 18th century in LGBT rights

See also 
Table of years in LGBT rights
List of LGBT firsts by year
Timeline of LGBT history

Years
LGBT